The 542nd Combat Sustainment Wing, sometimes written as 542d Combat Sustainment Wing, is an inactive wing of the United States Air Force last stationed at Robins Air Force Base, Georgia. It was inactivated in June 2010.

The wing was first organized in England as the 92nd Bombardment Wing, a heavy bombardment headquarters of VIII Bomber Command during World War II and took part in the air offensive against Germany until the surrender of Germany in 1945. In 1973, Military Airlift Command (MAC) activated the 1550th Aircrew Test and Training Wing at Hill Air Force Base, Utah. The wing trained aircrews for MAC, Air Mobility Command and Air Education and Training Command from 1971 to 1994 for search and rescue and special operations missions. In 1991 the wing was renumbered and consolidated with the 92nd Bombardment Wing as the 542nd Crew Training Wing. It was inactivated in 1994 and its mission, personnel and equipment were transferred to the 58th Special Operations Wing, which was simultaneously activated. The wing was redesignated the 542nd Combat Sustainment Wing in 2005 and activated as a logistics support organization, part of the Air Force Materiel Command Transformation project.

History

World War II
The wing was originally organized in 1943 as the 92d Bombardment Wing, an operational command wing for Eighth Air Force. The wing entered combat on 11 December 1943, but its groups were withdrawn and it was not operational again until May 1944, although it conducted flying training operations in April. The wing flew in combat in the European Theater until November 1944 when its assigned bombardment groups were attached to another wing. In February 1945 the groups were reassigned. The wing returned to the United States in July 1945 and was disbanded the following month.

Crew Training
The 1550th Aircrew Test and Training Wing was activated in 1973 at Hill Air Force Base, Utah, where it trained all USAF helicopter aircrews and trained HC-130 crews for search and rescue missions. It also provided pararescue training and, operational test and evaluation of materiel, and performed local search and rescue missions. It moved to Kirtland Air Force Base, New Mexico. in 1976 and expanded its mission to include special operations training. By 1990, the wing's primary focus would be on special operations training. In 1983, the wing deployed three aircraft to support Operation Urgent Fury, the invasion of Grenada in the Windward Islands.

From 1984 it focused on the training mission and was redesignated the 1550th Combat Crew Training Wing. In 1991, as the Air Force abolished the MAJCON (four-digit) unit system, the wing was merged with the 92d Bombardment Wing and renamed the 542d Crew Training Wing. Along with the new name, the wing acquired three groups and assumed host responsibility for Kirtland from the 1606th Air Base Wing as it reorganized as a USAF Objective Wing. That same year it deployed aircrew, maintenance personnel and operations personnel to support Operation Desert Storm. Wing aircrews were responsible for the rescue of seven aircrew during the operation. It also deployed personnel to support Operation Provide Hope in Somalia. At the start of 1993, Kirtland Air Force Base transferred to Air Force Materiel Command, and the wing lost its responsibility to act as host together with two of its groups.

With General Merrill McPeak's call to retain historic United States Air Force units on the active list, the 542d was inactivated on 1 April 1994, while the newly redesignated 58th Special Operations Wing took over its training mission.

Logistics Operations
The wing was again activated in 2005 as the 542d Combat Sustainment Wing as part of the Air Force Materiel Command Transformation project, which replaced the staff agencies at Air Logistics Centers with wings, groups, and squadrons. Its mission was to design, acquire, install, and sustain electronic warfare, avionics, support equipment, vehicles, missiles, automatic test systems and weapons. It was responsible for supply chain management for F-15, C-130 and C-5 aircraft and provided calibration standards and certification of Precision Measurement Laboratories worldwide. It was responsible for life-cycle management of over 800 systems valued at over $56 Billion. Its 542d Combat Sustainment Group supported assigned electronic warfare systems, the 642d Combat Sustainment Group supported assigned support equipment systems, the 752d Combat Sustainment Group supported assigned electronics systems, the 762d Combat Sustainment Group managed logistics support for all assigned systems, and its 782d Combat Sustainment Group supported assigned armament systems. the 742d Combat Sustainment Group supported precision measurement equipment worldwide.

Lineage
92d Bombardment Wing
 Constituted as 92d Bombardment Wing (Heavy) on 25 October 1943
 Activated on 1 November 1943
 Redesignated 92d Combat Bombardment Wing, Heavy on 24 August 1944
 Redesignated 92d Bombardment Wing, Heavy on 22 November 1944
 Disbanded on 28 August 1945.
 Reconstituted on 31 July 1985 and redesignated 542d Combat Crew Training Wing
 Consolidated with 1550th Combat Crew Training Wing on 1 October 1991

1550th Combat Crew Training Wing
 Designated as the 1550th Aircrew Test and Training Wing and activated on 1 April 1971
 Redesignated 1550th Combat Crew Training Wing on 15 May 1984
 Consolidated with the 542d Combat Crew Training Wing on 1 October 1991

Consolidated Wing
 Redesignated 542d Crew Training Wing on 1 October 1991
 Inactivated on 1 April 1994
 Redesignated 542d Combat Sustainment Wing on 31 January 2005
 Activated on 4 March 2005.
 Inactivated on 30 June 2010

Assignments
 VIII Bomber Command, 1 November 1943
 3d Bombardment Division (later, 3d Air Division), 31 March 1944 – 22 June 1945
 Second Air Force, 23 July 1945 – 28 August 1945
 Aerospace Rescue and Recovery Service, 1 April 1971
 Twenty-Third Air Force, 1 October 1983
 Twenty-Second Air Force 21 May 1990
 Nineteenth Air Force 1 July 1993 – 1 April 1994
 Warner Robins Air Logistics Center, 4 March 2005 – 30 June 2010

Stations
 Polebrook, England (Station 110), 1 November 1943
 Camp Blainey, England (Station 116), ca. 12 December 1943
 Sudbury, England (Station 174), ca, 2 March 1944
 Bury St Edmunds (Station 468), England, ca. 18 November 1944
 Elveden Hall (Station 116), England, 12 February 1945 – ca. 13 July 1945
 Sioux Falls Army Air Field, South Dakota, 23 July 1945 – 28 August 1945
 Hill Air Force Base, Utah, 1 April 1971
 Kirtland Air Force Base, New Mexico 15 March 1976 – 1 April 1994
 Robins Air Force Base, Georgia, 4 March 2005 – 30 Jun 2010

Components

Groups
World War II

 351st Bombardment Group, 1 November 1943 – 15 December 1943
 401st Bombardment Group, 1 November 1943 – 15 December 1943

 486th Bombardment Group, 4 April 1944 – ca. 12 February 1945
 487th Bombardment Group, 30 June 1944 – 10 February 1945

Crew Training
 542d Medical Group, 1 October 1991 – 1 January 1993
 542d Operations Group, 1 October 1991 – 1 October 1994
 542d Support Group, 1 October 1991 – 1 January 1993

Crew Training and Logistics Operations
 542d Logistics Group (later 542d Electronic Warfare Systems Sustainment Group, 542d Combat Sustainment Group), 1 October 1991 – 1 October 1994, 4 March 2005 – 30 June 2010

Logistics Operations

 542d Armament Sustainment Gp, 4 March 2005 – 28 April 2006
 542d Automatic Test Sustainment Gp, 4 March 2005 – 28 April 2006
 542d Electronics Sustainment Gp, 4 March 2005 – 28 April 2006
 542d Materiel Sustainment Gp, 4 March 2005 – 28 April 2006
 542d Support Equipment and Vehicle Sustainment Gp, 4 March 2005 – 28 April 2006
 562d Combat Sustainment Group, 17 Apr 2006 – 30 Jun 2010

 642d Combat Sustainment Group, 17 Apr 2006 – 30 Jun 2010
 742d Combat Sustainment Group, 17 Apr 2006 – 30 Jun 2010
 752d Combat Sustainment Group, 17 Apr 2006 – 30 Jun 2010
 762d Combat Sustainment Group, 17 Apr 2006 – 30 Jun 2010
 782d Combat Sustainment Group, 17 Apr 2006 – 30 Jun 2010

Squadrons

 589th Combat Sustainment Squadron, 17 Apr 2006 – 30 Jun 2010
 1550th Flying Training Squadron, 1 April 1971 – 1 October 1991
 1551st Flying Training Squadron, 1 April 1971 – 1 October 1991
 1552d Flying Training Squadron, 1 April 1971 – 31 December 1972
 1550th Avionics Maintenance Squadron, 1 April 1971 – 30 Sep 1973
 1550th Consolidated Aircraft Maintenance Squadron, 1 July 1974 – 1 April 1977

 1550th Field Maintenance Squadron, 1 April 1971 – 1 July 1974, 1 April 1977 – 1 October 1991
 1550th Organizational Maintenance Squadron, 1 April 1971 – 1 July 1974, 1 April 1977 – 1 October 1991
 1550th Student Squadron, 1 April 1971 – 1 March 1973
 1550th Technical Training Squadron, 1 March 1973 – 1 October 1991

Aircraft

 Boeing B-17 Flying Fortress, 1943–1945
 Consolidated B-24 Liberator, 1944
 Lockheed HC-130 Hercules, 1971–1994
 Lockheed JC-130 Hercules, 1986–1987
 Lockheed MC-130 Hercules, 1993–1994

 Bell HH-1 Iroquois (Huey), 1973–1975
 Bell TH-1 Iroquois (Huey), 1971–1977
 Bell UH-1 Iroquois (Huey), 1971–1994
 H-3, 1971–1972
 Sikorsky CH-3, 1976–1994
 Sikorsky HH-3 (Jolly Green Giant), 1973–1994

 Kaman HH-43 Huskie, 1971–1975
 Sikorsky H-53, 1971–1973
 Sikorsky CH-53, 1973–1994
 Sikorsky HH-53 (Super Jolly), 1973–1994
 Sikorsky MH-53 PAVE LOW, 1983–1994
 Sikorsky UH-60 Black Hawk, 1988–1994

Awards

References

Notes

Citations

Bibliography
 
 
 
 
 

Further reading

 
 World Airpower Journal. (1992). US Air Force Air Power Directory. Aerospace Publishing: London, UK.

External links
 1550th Combat Crew Training Wing, The MAC Flyer, October 1989 (retrieved 1 Jan 2013)
 Helis.com 1550th Aircew Training & Test Wing (retrieved 1 Jan 2013)

Sustainment wings of the United States Air Force